Ecast or eCast can refer to:

Companies
Ecast, Inc., a US-based place-based interactive media company
Ecast Network, a commonly used name for Ecast, Inc.
eCast Corporation, a US-based medical technology company
eCast Software, a subsidiary of eCast Corporation focusing on software